Ouchi or Ōuchi may refer to:

Geography
 Ouchi, Hubei, a town in Gong'an County, Jingzhou, Hubei, China

Japan
 Ōuchi, Akita, a town now merged into Yurihonjō, Akita
 Ouchi, Saga, a town now merged into Karatsu-city]], Saga
 Ōuchi-juku, a post station in Japan's Edo period

People
 Ōuchi clan, powerful and important family in Japan during the reign of the Ashikaga shogunate in the 12th to 14th centuries
, Japanese photographer
Hisashi Ouchi, technician involved in the 1999 Tokaimura nuclear accident
Keigo Ōuchi (1930–2016), Japanese politician
Ōuchi Hyōei, Japanese economist
, Japanese former professional shogi player
 William G. Ouchi (born 1943), American professor and author in the field of business management

Judo techniques
 Ouchi gaeshi
 Ōuchi gari

See also
 Ouchy, a lakeside resort in Switzerland

Japanese-language surnames